An epiphyseal line is an epiphyseal plate that has become ossified. The process of it forming from an epiphyseal plate is named epiphyseal closure. In adult humans, it marks the point of fusion between the epiphysis and the metaphysis.

Function 
The epiphyseal line serves no function in the bone, being purely vestigial. However, it serves as an indicator of the boundary between the epiphysis and diaphysis.

References 

Skeletal system
Medical mnemonics
Animal physiology
Tissues (biology)